Corrales may refer to:

People
 Corrales (surname)

Places
 Corrales, New Mexico
 Corrales, Boyacá, Colombia
 Corrales de Duero, municipality in the province of Valladolid, Castile and León, Spain
 Corrales del Vino, municipality in the province of Zamora, Castile and León, Spain
Los Corrales, municipality in the province of Seville, Andalusia, Spain
Los Corrales de Buelna, municipality in the autonomous community of Cantabria, Spain
 Corrales, Aguadilla, Puerto Rico, a barrio